Chinese massacre may refer to:

Violence against Chinese people 

 The Chinese Massacre of 1871 (Los Angeles), where 18 Chinese immigrants were lynched
 The Torreón massacre in 1911, where the forces of the Mexican Revolution killed 300 Chinese immigrants in Torreón
 The Nanking Massacre in 1937, perpetrated by the Imperial Japanese Army during the Second Sino-Japanese War
 The May 1998 riots of Indonesia

Violence instigated by the Chinese Communist Party 
 The 1989 Tiananmen Square protests and massacre, where the People's Liberation Army killed hundreds to thousands of civilian protesters.

Other uses 

 List of massacres in China